Xu Yongjiu (born 29 October 1964) is a Chinese former racewalking athlete. She was Asia's first world champion in the sport.

From the Chinese province of Liaoning, Xu trained at the Hebei Xinglong National Athletic Training Base.

She had the greatest season of her career in 1983. On her international debut at the 1983 IAAF World Race Walking Cup she came away with the gold medal, also leading China's women to a team victory. This made her Asia's first ever world champion in racewalking. Her winning time of 45:14 minutes was the fastest for the 10 kilometres race walk that year. She claimed the first ever women's walk title at the National Games of China later that year, beating all national opposition in 49:04 minutes.

Xu attempted a title defence at the 1985 IAAF World Race Walking Cup, but lost out in a close affair in fifth place, ten seconds behind the winner. She was again part of the gold medal-winning team as the Chinese women were led by the top two finishers Yan Hong and Guan Ping. On time she ranked third globally that year, with 44:45 minutes, behind only her countrywomen Yan and Guan. 44:45A women's walking event was added for the first time to the continental programme at the 1986 Asian Games and the Chinese women were dominant, with Guan winning the race and Xu in second place ten seconds in arrears.

Her final appearance at global level came at the 1987 IAAF World Race Walking Cup, but this was among the worst results for her country at the competition, as the trio of Xu, Yan and Guan were all disqualified for foot lifting, leaving the national team down in an historic low of ninth place.

After her retirement she remarked upon the extreme pressures she had gone through to reach the heights of the sport: "Several times I fainted on the training grounds. I will never forget that moment so painful that one can no longer feel pain." Academic Susan Brownell placed Xu's suffering within a wider context of the theme of self-sacrifice in Chinese women's sports.

International competitions

References

Living people
1964 births
Athletes from Liaoning
Chinese female racewalkers
Asian Games medalists in athletics (track and field)
Athletes (track and field) at the 1986 Asian Games
Asian Games silver medalists for China
Medalists at the 1986 Asian Games
World Athletics Race Walking Team Championships winners